George Symes may refer to:

George G. Symes (1840–1893), U.S. Representative from Colorado
George Stewart Symes (1882–1962), Governor-General of the Anglo-Egyptian Sudan
George William Symes (1896–1980), British Army officer